Monticalia is a genus of flowering plants in the family Asteraceae.

Species include:
Monticalia angustifolia
Monticalia befarioides
Monticalia empetroides
Monticalia microdon
Monticalia micropachyphyllus
Monticalia mutisii
Monticalia myrsinites
Monticalia nitida
Monticalia peruviana
Monticalia pulchella
Monticalia rosmarinifolia
Monticalia stuebelii
Monticalia teretifolia

Taxonomy
The genus was described by Charles Jeffrey and published in Kew Bulletin 47: 69. 1992.

References

 
Asteraceae genera
Taxonomy articles created by Polbot